Vasilios Gavriilidis (born 20 October 1992) is a Greek professional footballer who plays as a midfielder for Super League 2 club Niki Volos.

Club career
Born in Zakynthos, Greece, Vasilis made his senior debut with Football League 2 side Panthrakikos, in the 2015–16 season and had the contract with the club until July, 2017 . On 31, January 2017, he joined Panserraikos. He profoundly played for Greek clubs.

Initially signed by the Greek club Zakynthos, he had no appearance for the senior squad and followed a transfer to Kavala in 2012 playing for Gamma Ethniki . He then signed a contract of half-a-year with Greek club playing in Gamma Ethniki namely Zakynthos and remained for the club until 2013. In the mid of 2013 He was a free agent. In 2014, Gavriilidis signed a year spell with the Kavala again. In 2015,  he was at Panthrakikos playing 19 games. This made the fame rise of him. whereby the Greek stayed at the club until mid-2017. He penned a deal with Greek club Panserraikos securing major 14 appearances for the club. The gained a decent momentum for having long-enough period that he appeared for the club.

He then moved to Panegialios in 2017 and played 25 games scoring the goal twice against PAE Eginiakos and Apollon Larisas whereby the midfielder make a huge rise in market value.
 
Vasilios moved to Kavala, finally, playing in Football League for Kavala also acting as a skipper of the side at his third spell.

He had also appeared in Greek Football Cup or Kypello Elladas.

References

1992 births
Living people
Greek footballers
Association football defenders
Gamma Ethniki players
Football League (Greece) players
Super League Greece players
Super League Greece 2 players
A.P.S. Zakynthos players
Kavala F.C. players
Panthrakikos F.C. players
Panserraikos F.C. players
Panegialios F.C. players
Veria NFC players
Niki Volos F.C. players
People from Zakynthos
Sportspeople from the Ionian Islands (region)